Kian Reza Kazemi (born January 26, 1986) is an Iranian-Filipino actor, reality show contestant and TV host.

Personal life
Kazemi's father is Iranian and his mother Charito is a Filipina of mixed Spanish descent. His father is in the Persian carpet business.

Kazemi owns and manages Persia Grill, where he also works as a cook.

Filmography

Television

Film

Awards and nominations

References

1986 births
Living people
21st-century Filipino male actors
De La Salle–College of Saint Benilde alumni
Filipino male television actors
Star Magic
Pinoy Big Brother contestants
Filipino people of Iranian descent
Filipino people of Spanish descent
People from Makati
Male actors from Metro Manila
Filipino chefs
Filipino restaurateurs
Businesspeople from Metro Manila
Filipino male film actors